The 2023 Northeast Conference Men's Basketball Tournament was the postseason men's basketball tournament for the Northeast Conference for the 2022–23 NCAA Division I men's basketball season. The tournament took place on three dates between March 1, and March 7, 2023, and all tournament games were played on home arenas of the higher-seeded school. The winner, Merrimack, did not receive the conference's automatic bid to the 2023 NCAA Division I men's basketball tournament due to not being eligible because of a transition from Division II. Instead, the runner-up, Farleigh Dickinson, earned lucky loser status and was awarded the conference's automatic bid.

Seeds 
All eight eligible teams of the nine members of the conference will qualify. Effective for the 2022–23 academic year, NEC teams transitioning from Division II are eligible for the NEC tournament during their third and fourth years of the transition period. If a reclassifying institution wins the NEC tournament championship, the conference's automatic bid to the NCAA tournament goes to the NEC tournament runner up. The rule change regarding reclassifying institutions results in Merrimack being eligible for the 2023 NEC tournament, since it is in its fourth transition year.

Teams will be seeded by record within the conference, with a tiebreaker system to seed teams with identical conference records.

Stonehill College joined the Northeast Conference from the Division II Northeast-10 Conference. Stonehill is ineligible for the NCAA tournament until the 2026-27 season during its four-year reclassification period and won’t be eligible for the NEC tournament until the 2024-25 season.

Schedule

Bracket 
Teams are reseeded after each round with highest remaining seeds receiving home court advantage.

Due to Merrimack's ineligibility, the semifinal between Saint Francis and Fairleigh Dickinson decided the NEC's automatic bid to the NCAA tournament.

Awards and honors 
Tournament MVP: Ziggy Reid

First Team
 Ziggy Reid, Merrimack
 Javon Bennett, Merrimack
 Jordan Minor, Merrimack
 Ansley Almonor, Fairleigh Dickinson
 Demetre Roberts, Fairleigh Dickinson

References 

Tournament
Northeast Conference men's basketball tournament
Northeast Conference men's basketball tournament